Karen H. Antman is an American physician. She is the dean of Boston University School of Medicine and provost of the Boston University Medical Campus. Antman developed standards for the treatment of patients receiving chemotherapy including pharmacology, growth factors and mobilization of peripheral blood derived stem cells for blood and marrow transplant.

Her professional affiliations include serving on the Administration Board of the Association of American Medical Colleges Council of Deans, the Journal of the American Medical Association Oversight Committee, the International Editorial Board of Lancet, and on the board of the Educational Commission for Foreign Medical Graduates (ECFMG). She was elected to the Institute of Medicine in 2011.

Publishing and research
She has served as an associate editor of the New England Journal of Medicine, and on the Council of the National Institutes of Health's Fogarty International Center. Her publications number more than 300, and she is the editor of four textbooks: Asbestos-related Malignancies, Sarcomas of bone and soft tissue, High-dose cancer therapy that includes pharmacology, hematopoietins and stem cells (three editions), Molecular Targeting in Oncology).

Antman's publications also include reviews and editorials on medical policy and the impact of research funding and managed care on American clinical research. She has testified before congressional subcommittees on eight occasions on National Institutes of Health (NIH) appropriations and medical policy. She has lectured to lay audiences and has written articles in Vogue and in Reader's Digest on cancer prevention and screening.

Publications
Antman KH. Current concepts: Malignant mesothelioma. N Engl J. Med. 303:200-202, 1980.
Antman KH, Livingston DM. Intracellular neutralization of SV40 tumor antigens following microinjection of specific antibody. Cell. 19:627-635, 1980.
Antman K, Klegar K, Pomfret E, Osteen R, Amato D, Larsos D, Corson J, Early peritoneal mesothlioma: A treatable malignancy. Lancet. ii:977-982, 1985.
Advisory Committee for the International Autologous Bone Marrow Transplant Registry, Bone marrow autotrans¬plantation in man, report of an international cooperative study. Lancet I:960-62, 1986.
Talcott J, W Thurber, E Gaensler, K Antman, F Li. Mesothelioma manufacturers of asbestos-containing cigarette filters. Lancet, i:392, 1987.
Socinski M, Cannistra S, Elias A, Antman K, et al. Granulocyte-macrophage colony stimulating factor expands the circulating hematopoietic progenitor cell compartment in humans, Lancet. 1988, i:1194-8.
Antman K, Griffin J, Elias A, Socinski M, et al. The effect of recombinant human granulocyte-macrophage colony stimulating factor on chemotherapy-induced myelosuppression. N Engl J Med 319:593-8, 1988.
Li F, Dreyfus M, Antman K Asbestos-contaminated nappies & familial mesothelioma, Lancet i:909-10, 1989.
Talcott JA, Thurber WA, Kantor A, Gaensler EA, Danahy JF, Antman KH, Li FP, Asbestos-associated diseases in a cohort of cigarette-filter workers, N Engl J Med 321:1220-3, 1989.
Antman K, Ayash L, Elias A, et al. Phase II study of high dose cyclophosphamide, thiotepa, & carboplatin with autologous marrow support in measurable advanced breast cancer responding to standard dose therapy. J Clin Oncol, 10;102-10, 1992.
Elias A, Ayash L, Anderson K, Hunt M, Wheeler C, Schwartz G, Tepler I, Mazanet R, Lynch C, Pap S, Pelaez J, Reich E, Critchlow J, Demitri G, Bibbo J, Schnipper L, Griffin J, Frei E, Antman K. Mobilization of peripheral blood progenitor cells by chemotherapy and GM-CSF for hematologic support after high dose intensification for breast cancer. Blood 79:3036-44, 1992.
Alvegard TA, Antman K, Bacchi M, L H Baker, et al. Adjuvant chemotherapy for localised resectable soft tissue sarcoma of adults: A meta-analysis of individual patient data. Lancet 1997; 350:1647-54.
Frank T, Manley S, Olopade O, Cummings S, Garber J, Bernhardt B, Antman K, et al. Sequence analysis of BRCA1 and BRCA2: Correlation of mutations with family history and ovarian cancer risk. J Clin Oncol 1998;16:2417-25.
Antman K, Shea S. Screening mammography under age 50. JAMA 1999;281:1470-1472.
Grann V. R., Whang W., Jacobson J. S., Heitjan D. F., Antman K. H., Neugut A. I. Benefits and costs of screening Ashkenazi Jewish women for BRCA1 and BRCA2. J Clin Oncol 1999;17:494-500.
Antman K, Heitjan D, Hortobagy Gabriel. High-dose chemotherapy for breast cancer. JAMA 1999;282:1701-1703.
Antman K and Y Chang, Kaposi's Sarcoma. New England Journal of Medicine 342:1027-38, 2000.
R Moslehi, D Russo, C Phelan, E Jack, K Antman and S Narod. An unaffected individual from a breast/ovarian cancer family with germline mutations in both BRCA1 and BRCA2 Clin Genet 2000:57:70-73.
Antman, K, S Lagakos, J Drazen. Designing and Funding Clinical Trials of Novel Therapies, N Eng J Med 344:762-3, 2001
Antman K., Benson M. C., et al., Complementary and alternative medicine: the role of the cancer center. J Clin Oncol 2001;19:55S-60S.
K Antman,  AF Abraido-Lanza, D Blum, et al., Reducing Disparities in Breast Cancer Survival, 2002, 75:269-80.
Savage DG & KH Antman. Imatinib mesylate: a new oral targeted therapy, New Eng J Med. 2002, 346:683-93.
Tiersten A. D., Nelsen C., Talbot S., Vahdat L., Fine R., Troxel A., Brafman L., Shriberg L., Antman K., Petrylak D. P. A phase II trial of docetaxel and estramustine in patients with refractory metastatic breast carcinoma. Cancer 2003;97:537-44.
Zalupski MM, Rankin C, Ryan JR, Lucas DR, Muler J, Lanier KS, Budd GT, Biermann JS, Meyers FJ, Antman K. Adjuvant therapy of osteosarcoma—A Phase II trial: Southwest Oncology Group study 9139. Cancer 2004;100(4):818-25.
Hassan R, Alexander R, Antman K, Boffetta P, Churg A, Coit D, Hausner P, Kennedy R, Kindler H, Metintas M, Mutti L, Onda M, Pass H, Premkumar A, Roggli V, Sterman D, Sugarbaker P, Taub R, Verschraegen C. Current treatment options and biology of peritoneal mesothelioma: meeting summary of the first NIH peritoneal mesothelioma conference. Ann Oncol 2006.
Antman K, Hassan R, Eisner M, Ries LA, Edwards BK. Update on malignant mesothelioma. Oncology (Williston Park) 2005;19(10):1301-9; discussion 1309–10, 1313–6.
Murabito JM, Rosenberg CL, Finger D, Kreger BE, Levy D, Splansky GL, Antman K, Hwang SJ. A genome-wide association study of breast and prostate cancer in the NHLBI's Framingham Heart Study. BMC Med Genet 2007;8 Suppl 1:S6.
Duley L, Antman K, Arena J, Avezum A, et al. Specific barriers to the conduct of randomized trials. Clin Trials 2008;5(1):40-8.

External links
 Official Biography

Boston University people
Living people
Year of birth missing (living people)
Members of the National Academy of Medicine